Ogbeta is a surname. Notable people with the surname include:

Naomi Ogbeta (born 1998), British triple jumper
Nathanael Ogbeta (born 2001), English footballer